Emphreus tuberculosus is a species of beetle in the family Cerambycidae. It was described by Per Olof Christopher Aurivillius in 1910, originally under the genus Phrynesthis.

References

Stenobiini
Beetles described in 1910
Taxa named by Per Olof Christopher Aurivillius